Portugal participated in the Eurovision Song Contest 2007 with the song "Dança comigo" written by Emanuel and Tó Maria Vinhas. The song was performed by Sabrina. The Portuguese broadcaster Rádio e Televisão de Portugal (RTP) organised the national final Festival da Canção 2007 in order to select the Portuguese entry for the 2007 contest in Helsinki, Finland. The competition took place on 10 March 2007 where the winner was selected exclusively by public televoting. "Dança comigo" performed by Sabrina emerged as the winner with 8,874 votes.

Portugal competed in the semi-final of the Eurovision Song Contest which took place on 10 May 2007. Performing during the show in position 17, "Dança comigo" was not announced among the top 10 entries of the semi-final and therefore did not qualify to compete in the final. It was later revealed that Portugal placed eleventh out of the 28 participating countries in the semi-final with 88 points.

Background 
Prior to the 2007 contest, Portugal had participated in the Eurovision Song Contest forty times since its first entry in 1964. The nation's highest placing in the contest was sixth, which they achieved in 1996 with the song "O meu coração não tem cor" performed by Lúcia Moniz. Following the introduction of semi-finals for the 2004, Portugal had, to this point, yet to feature in a final. Portugal's least successful result has been last place, which they have achieved on three occasions, most recently in 1997 with the song "Antes do adeus" performed by Célia Lawson. Portugal has also received nul points on two occasions; in 1964 and 1997. The nation failed to qualify to the final in 2006 with the song "Coisas de nada" performed by Nonstop.

The Portuguese national broadcaster, Rádio e Televisão de Portugal (RTP), broadcasts the event within Portugal and organises the selection process for the nation's entry. RTP confirmed Portugal's participation in the 2007 Eurovision Song Contest on 11 December 2006. The broadcaster has traditionally selected the Portuguese entry for the Eurovision Song Contest via the music competition Festival da Canção, with exceptions in 1988 and 2005 when the Portuguese entries were internally selected. Along with their participation confirmation, the broadcaster revealed details regarding their selection procedure and announced the organization of Festival da Canção 2007 in order to select the 2007 Portuguese entry.

Before Eurovision

Festival da Canção 2007 
Festival da Canção 2007 was the 43rd edition of Festival da Canção that selected Portugal's entry for the Eurovision Song Contest 2007. Ten entries competed in the competition which took place on 10 March 2007 at Sala Tejo of the Pavilhão Atlantico in Lisbon. The show was hosted by Isabel Angelino and Jorge Gabriel and broadcast on RTP1 and RTP Internacional as well as online via the broadcaster's official website rtp.pt.

Competing entries 
Ten producers were invited by RTP for the competition. The producers worked in coordination with their selected composers and performers on the songs which were required to be created and submitted in Portuguese (with exceptions for a small part of the song which could be in any other language) by 19 February 2007 in its final versions. The selected producers were revealed on 12 February 2007, while the competing artists were revealed on 15 February 2007. Among the producers was former Eurovision Song Contest entrant José Cid, who represented Portugal in the 1980 and 1998 contests (the latter as part of the group Alma Lusa).

Final 
The final took place on 10 March 2007. Ten entries competed and the winner, "Dança comigo" performed by Sabrina, was selected solely by a public televote. In addition to the performances of the competing entries, Jorge Mourato together with Marco Horácio, Carlos Coincas, Vânia Oliveira and Sofia Froes, and member of Portuguese Eurovision 2006 entrant Nonstop Kátia Moreira performed as the interval acts.

At Eurovision
According to Eurovision rules, all nations with the exceptions of the host country, the "Big Four" (France, Germany, Spain and the United Kingdom), and the ten highest placed finishers in the 2006 contest are required to qualify from the semi-final on 10 May 2007 in order to compete for the final on 12 May 2007; the top ten countries from the semi-final progress to the final. On 12 March 2007, a special allocation draw was held which determined the running order for the semi-final and Portugal was set to perform in position 17, following the entry from Czech Republic and before the entry from Macedonia.

In Portugal, the two shows were broadcast on RTP1 and RTP Internacional with commentary by Isabel Angelino and Jorge Gabriel. The Portuguese spokesperson, who announced the Portuguese votes during the final, was Francisco Mendes.

Semi-final 

Sabrina took part in technical rehearsals on 14 and 18 May, followed by dress rehearsals on 21 and 22 May. The Portuguese performance featured Sabrina wearing a short white dress performing a dance routine with five dancers also dressed in silver, three of them also providing backing vocals and making use of huge reversible fans which held in formation at times throughout the performance: Ana Ferreira, Ana Gonçalves, Andreia, Cláudia Soares and Nélson Araújo. The LED screens displayed a sea of swirling reds.

At the end of the show, Portugal was not announced among the top 10 entries in the semi-final and therefore failed to qualify to compete in the final. It was later revealed that Portugal placed eleventh in the semi-final, receiving a total of 88 points.

Voting 
Below is a breakdown of points awarded to Portugal and awarded by Portugal in the semi-final and grand final of the contest. The nation awarded its 12 points to Moldova in the semi-final and to Ukraine in the final of the contest.

Points awarded to Portugal

Points awarded by Portugal

References

2007
Countries in the Eurovision Song Contest 2007
Eurovision